Daniel D. Sparks (born July 5, 1968) is an American politician and former member of the Minnesota Senate.  A member of the Minnesota Democratic–Farmer–Labor Party (DFL), he represented District 27 which included all or portions of Dodge County, Faribault County, Freeborn County, Mower County, and Steele County in the southeastern part of Minnesota.

Early life and education 
Sparks attended college at the University of Minnesota and St. Cloud State University in St. Cloud.

Elections
Sparks was elected to the Senate in 2002, defeating Senator Grace Schwab by seven votes after an automatic recount. He was reelected in 2006, 2010, 2012, and 2016. In the 2020 election, Sparks was defeated by Republican Gene Dornink.

Personal life
He and his wife Andrea live in Austin with their four children. He has worked in road construction, at the Austin Hormel plant, at Farmers and Merchants Bank in Austin and on the family farm. Sparks has also been on the YMCA Board of Directors, is a member of the local Lions Club, and is involved in youth hockey and Little League.

References

External links

1968 births
Living people
Democratic Party Minnesota state senators
People from Austin, Minnesota
American Lutherans
University of Minnesota alumni
21st-century American politicians